William Caine (28 August 1873 – 5 September 1925) was a British author.

Biography
He was born in Liverpool, the son of William Sproston Caine and Alice, daughter of the Rev. Hugh Stowell Brown. He was educated at Manor House School in Clapham, Westminster School, St Andrews University and Balliol College, Oxford. After leaving Oxford he was called to the bar, but after seven years abandoned that profession for writing. He married harpist Edith Gordon Walker, daughter of Farmer R. Walker of Boston, Massachusetts, and lived at 16 The Pryors, East Heath Road, London NW3. He was a member of the Reform Club and his recreations included trout-fishing and sketching.

Publications

References

1873 births
1925 deaths
Novelists from Liverpool
People educated at Westminster School, London
Alumni of the University of St Andrews
Alumni of Balliol College, Oxford